Zakari Morou (born 12 December 1991) is a Togolese international footballer who plays as a midfielder.

Career
Born in Bafilo, Morou has played for Gomido, Liberty Professionals, Free State Stars, Al-Nahda and Anges.

He earned eight caps for the Togolese national team between 2010 and 2012.

References

1991 births
Living people
Togolese footballers
Togo international footballers
Gomido FC players
Liberty Professionals F.C. players
Free State Stars F.C. players
Al-Nahda Club (Oman) players
Anges FC players
Association football midfielders
Togolese expatriate footballers
Togolese expatriates in Ghana
Expatriate footballers in Ghana
Togolese expatriates in South Africa
Expatriate soccer players in South Africa
Togolese expatriates in Oman
Expatriate footballers in Oman
21st-century Togolese people